The Arctic Lake Plateau, also called the Arctic Plateau, is a lava plateau in northwestern British Columbia, Canada. It is located northeast of Arctic Lake at the south end of Mount Edziza Provincial Park and Recreation Area.

This Arctic Lake should not be confused with the other Arctic Lakes in British Columbia, which lies northeast of the city of Prince George in a pairing known as the Arctic and Pacific Lakes, which with their adjoining mountain ranges are at the northwestern extremity of the McGregor Plateau

See also
Mount Edziza volcanic complex

References

Lava plateaus

Mount Edziza volcanic complex
Stikine Country
Tahltan Highland